Epigastric veins may refer to:
 Inferior epigastric vein
 Superior epigastric vein
 Superficial epigastric vein